Durgin is a surname. Notable people with the surname include:

Bob Durgin, American radio personality
Calvin T. Durgin (1893–1965), U.S. Navy vice admiral
Doranna Durgin, American author
Ezra Durgin (1796–1863), American politician
Harriet Thayer Durgin (1843–1912), American artist
Lawrence L. Durgin (1918–1981), American Congregational minister and social activist
Lyle Durgin (1845–1904), American artist